"Something in the Way (You Make Me Feel)" is a 1989 single by Stephanie Mills from her album Home.  It was Mills' fourth R&B number one on Billboard's Top R&B Songs chart. The single was both written and produced by Angela Winbush, who had overseen her first R&B number one I Have Learned to Respect the Power of Love in 1986.

Charts

Weekly charts

Year-end charts

References

1989 singles
Stephanie Mills songs
Songs written by Angela Winbush
1989 songs
MCA Records singles